Omri Gandelman (born 16 May 2000) is an Israeli association footballer who plays as a midfielder for Maccabi Netanya and the Israel national team.

Early life
Gandelman was born in Hod HaSharon, Israel, to a family of Ashkenazi Jewish descent. His father is Israeli former basketball player Shmuel Gandelman, and grandson of Rami Gandelman who was a basketball manager and a sports personality in Jerusalem.

Career
Gandelman is a youth product of the academies of the Israeli clubs Hapoel Hod HaSharon, Maccabi Petah Tikva and Hapoel Ra'anana. In 2018, he was scouted by the German academy of Wehen Wiesbaden and had a stint there, before returning to Israel for military service and joined the academy of Maccabi Netanya. He made his professional debut with Maccabi Netanya in a 3–1 Israeli Premier League win over Ironi Kiryat Shmona on 2 June 2020.

International career
He has been part of Israel under-21s since 2021.

Coming on as a substitute within the first half, Gandelman debuted with the senior Israel national team in a 4–2 2022 FIFA World Cup qualification away loss against Austria on 12 November 2021.

References

External links
 

2000 births
Living people
Israeli footballers
Association football midfielders
Maccabi Netanya F.C. players
Israeli Premier League players
Israeli expatriate footballers
Expatriate footballers in Germany
Israeli expatriate sportspeople in Germany
Footballers from Hod HaSharon
Israel international footballers
Israel under-21 international footballers
Israeli Ashkenazi Jews